The Battle of New Ross may refer to:

 The Battle of New Ross (1643), a battle of the Irish Confederate Wars, fought on March 18, 1643
 The Battle of New Ross (1798), a battle of the Irish Rebellion of 1798, fought on June 5, 1798